Hold the Line is a 1978 song by Toto.

Hold the Line may also refer to:
Hold the Line, a 1961 song by Pete Seeger
Hold the Line (Jeanette song), a 2003 song
Hold the Line (Brown Eyed Girls song), a 2006 song
Hold the Line (Avicii song), a 2019 song